Alfred Mäeloog (8 September 1885, in Tartu – 6 January 1955, in Sydney) was an Estonian politician. He was a member of Estonian National Assembly.

References

1885 births
1955 deaths
Members of the Estonian National Assembly
Estonian World War II refugees
Estonian emigrants to Australia
Politicians from Tartu